The Protocol for the Reconstruction of Hungary was an agreement concluded on 14 March 1924 between the government of Hungary and the governments of Great Britain, France, Italy, Romania, Yugoslavia and Czechoslovakia, providing for a gradual reconstruction of the Hungarian economy under League of Nations supervision.

Terms 
The Protocol consisted of two declarations, both issued on the same day. In declaration No. 1, the signatory parties undertook not to violate Hungarian territorial or economic independence, and the Hungarian government undertook not to violate the military clauses of the Treaty of Trianon. Declaration No. 2 specified the steps to be taken to reconstruct the Hungarian economy.

See also 
 Protocol for the reconstruction of Austria

Sources 
 Text of declaration No. 1 of the protocol
 Text of declaration No. 2 of the protocol

Notes 

Interwar-period treaties
League of Nations treaties
Treaties of the Kingdom of Hungary (1920–1946)
Economic history of Hungary
1924 in Hungary
Treaties concluded in 1924
Treaties of the Kingdom of Yugoslavia
Treaties of the United Kingdom
Treaties of the French Third Republic
Treaties of the Kingdom of Italy (1861–1946)
Treaties of the Kingdom of Romania
Treaties of Czechoslovakia
1924 in Switzerland
Greater Romania